Linda Kay Manns (formerly Snyder; née Fickus; July 4, 1965 – August 19, 2008), was the first Miss Alaska Teen USA in 1983, the year the Miss Teen USA pageant debuted. She appeared in the 1983 Miss Teen USA Pageant telecast from Lakeland, Florida and was a press favorite.

Born in Fairbanks, Alaska, United States, to William and Lillian Fickus, she was crowned at age 17. She spent much of her childhood growing up on a ranch in the southern foothills of the Brooks Range in the Alaskan "bush". She was the third child of four, and the second daughter in the family to win a state pageant title.  Her older sister, Mrs. Deborah Luper was Miss Alaska USA in 1980.

Following her year as Miss Alaska Teen USA, she began a career in business & government that ultimately led to political appointments by Alaska Governor Frank Murkowski, who she served as Deputy Director of Boards & Commissions, and as Special Assistant. She also served in Governor Sarah Palin's Fairbanks office, was president of a local Republican Women's Club, and was a member of the Rotary Club. Prior to her death, she appeared as a special guest at the 2007 Miss Alaska Teen USA pageant.

Personal life
Fickus married James Snyder; the couple had two sons. Several years prior to her death, she married secondly, to Jeffrey Manns.

Death
Linda Kay Manns died in Fairbanks, Alaska, aged 43, on August 19, 2008, as the result of a long battle with breast cancer.

References

External links
 IMDb.com
 Alaskatrappers.org
 Catg.org

1965 births
2008 deaths
20th-century Native Americans
21st-century Native Americans
Alaskan Athabaskan people
Alaska Republicans
Deaths from cancer in Alaska
Deaths from breast cancer
Gwich'in people
20th-century Miss Teen USA delegates
People from Fairbanks, Alaska
People from Juneau, Alaska
People from Yukon–Koyukuk Census Area, Alaska
20th-century Native American women
21st-century Native American women